Jordi Valadon (born 4 March 2003) is an Australian professional footballer who plays as a midfielder for Melbourne City. He is of Mauritian ancestry.

Playing career
On 15 April 2022 he made his professional debut in the 2022 AFC Champions League group stage against BG Pathum United.

References

External links

2003 births
Living people
Australian soccer players
Association football midfielders
Melbourne City FC players
National Premier Leagues players
A-League Men players